Parachute Music Festival has been going since 1991, and have made compilation CDs since 1997, comprising mostly songs written by artists that perform at the festival. The CDs are not for sale but are distributed to the first 7500 people who bought tickets to the festival. From 2008 Parachute organisers have stopped producing the CDs, instead moving in favour of downloadable media posted on their website.

Discography

1997

1998

1999

2000

2001

2002

2003

2004

2005

2006

2007

2010
In 2010 free worship compilation CDs were available with a purchase from the Manna store. They were available for the 20th Parachute Music birthday celebrations.

External links
 Parachute Music
 Parachute 2011

Albums by New Zealand artists